Elasticsearch is a search engine based on the Lucene library. It provides a distributed, multitenant-capable full-text search engine with an HTTP web interface and schema-free JSON documents. Elasticsearch is developed in Java and is dual-licensed under the source-available Server Side Public License and the Elastic license, while other parts fall under the proprietary (source-available) Elastic License. Official clients are available in Java, .NET (C#), PHP, Python, Ruby and many other languages. According to the DB-Engines ranking, Elasticsearch is the most popular enterprise search engine.

History
Shay Banon created the precursor to Elasticsearch, called Compass, in 2004. While thinking about the third version of Compass he realized that it would be necessary to rewrite big parts of Compass to "create a scalable search solution". So he created "a solution built from the ground up to be distributed" and used a common interface, JSON over HTTP, suitable for programming languages other than Java as well. Shay Banon released the first version of Elasticsearch in February 2010.

Elastic NV was founded in 2012 to provide commercial services and products around Elasticsearch and related software. In June 2014, the company announced raising $70 million in a Series C funding round, just 18 months after forming the company. The round was led by New Enterprise Associates (NEA). Additional funders include Benchmark Capital and Index Ventures. This round brought total funding to $104M.

In March 2015, the company Elasticsearch changed its name to Elastic.

In June 2018, Elastic filed for an initial public offering with an estimated valuation of between 1.5 and 3 billion dollars. On 5 October 2018, Elastic was listed on the New York Stock Exchange.

Release history 

Major releases:
 1.0.0 – February 12, 2014
 2.0.0 – October 28, 2015
 5.0.0 – October 26, 2016
 6.0.0 – November 14, 2017
 7.0.0 – April 10, 2019
 8.0.0 – February 10, 2022

Licensing changes 
In January 2021, Elastic announced that starting with version 7.11, they would be relicensing their Apache 2.0 licensed code in Elasticsearch and Kibana to be dual licensed under Server Side Public License and the Elastic License, neither of which is recognized as an open-source license. Elastic blamed Amazon Web Services (AWS) for this change, objecting to AWS offering Elasticsearch and Kibana as a service directly to consumers and claiming that AWS was not appropriately collaborating with Elastic. Critics of the re-licensing decision predicted that it would harm Elastic's ecosystem and noted that Elastic had previously promised to "never....change the license of the Apache 2.0 code of Elasticsearch, Kibana, Beats, and Logstash". Amazon responded with plans to fork the projects and continue development under Apache License 2.0. Other users of the ElasticSearch ecosystem, including Logz.io, CrateDB and Aiven, also committed to the need for a fork, leading to a discussion of how to coordinate the open source efforts. Due to potential trademark issues with using the name "Elasticsearch", AWS rebranded their fork as OpenSearch in April 2021.

Features
Elasticsearch can be used to search any kind of document. It provides scalable search, has near real-time search, and supports multitenancy. "Elasticsearch is distributed, which means that indices can be divided into shards and each shard can have zero or more replicas. Each node hosts one or more shards and acts as a coordinator to delegate operations to the correct shard(s). Rebalancing and routing are done automatically". Related data is often stored in the same index, which consists of one or more primary shards, and zero or more replica shards. Once an index has been created, the number of primary shards cannot be changed.

Elasticsearch is developed alongside the data collection and log-parsing engine Logstash, the analytics and visualization platform Kibana, and the collection of lightweight data shippers called Beats. The four products are designed for use as an integrated solution, referred to as the "Elastic Stack". (Formerly the "ELK stack", short for "Elasticsearch, Logstash, Kibana".)

Elasticsearch uses Lucene and tries to make all its features available through the JSON and Java API. It supports facetting and percolating (a form of prospective search),  which can be useful for notifying if new documents match for registered queries. Another feature, "gateway", handles the long-term persistence of the index; for example, an index can be recovered from the gateway in the event of a server crash. Elasticsearch supports real-time GET requests, which makes it suitable as a NoSQL datastore, but it lacks distributed transactions.

On 20 May 2019, Elastic made the core security features of the Elastic Stack available free of charge, including TLS for encrypted communications, file and native realm for creating and managing users, and role-based access control for controlling user access to cluster APIs and indexes. The corresponding source code is available under the “Elastic License”, a source-available license. In addition, Elasticsearch now offers SIEM and Machine Learning  as part of its offered services.

Managed services
Developed from the Found acquisition by Elastic in 2015, Elastic Cloud is a family of Elasticsearch-powered SaaS offerings which include the Elasticsearch Service, as well as Elastic App Search Service, and Elastic Site Search Service which were developed from Elastic's acquisition of Swiftype. In late 2017, Elastic formed partnerships with Google to offer Elastic Cloud in GCP, and Alibaba to offer Elasticsearch and Kibana in Alibaba Cloud.

Elasticsearch Service on Elastic Cloud is the official hosted and managed Elasticsearch and Kibana offering from the creators of the project since August 2018 Elasticsearch Service users can create secure deployments with partners, Google Cloud Platform (GCP)  and Alibaba Cloud.

AWS previously offered Elasticsearch as a managed service beginning 2015. There are many companies that currently offer managed services, such as Elasticsearch, Instacluster, Opster, and Dattell. Such managed services provide hosting, deployment, backup and other support. Most managed services also include support for Kibana.

See also 
 Information extraction
 List of information retrieval libraries

References

External links
 

2018 initial public offerings
Companies listed on the New York Stock Exchange
Database-related software for Linux
Internet search engines
Search engine software